WNJS may refer to:

 WNJS-FM, a radio station (88.1 FM) licensed to Berlin, New Jersey, United States
 WNJS (TV), a television station (channel 23, virtual 23) licensed to Camden, New Jersey, United States